Rhenen is a municipality and a city in the central Netherlands.
The municipality also includes the villages of Achterberg, Remmerden, Elst and Laareind. The town lies at a geographically interesting location, namely on the southernmost part of the chain of hills known as the Utrecht Hill Ridge (Utrechtse Heuvelrug), where this meets the river Rhine. Because of this Rhenen has a unique character with quite some elevation through town.

History

Before 1900
Rhenen received city rights probably between 1256 and 1258. In 1346, the bishop of Utrecht ordered the construction of a defensive wall around the city, which was important because it lay near the border with Guelders. Although for some time the town collected toll from ships on the Rhine, it has never had a harbour. The three city gates were demolished in 1840. Small fragments of the wall remain.

The town is also famous for the Cunera Church, parts of which date back to the 15th century. Containing the relics of Saint Cunera, it attracted many pilgrims. Legend has it that Cunera was buried on a nearby hill now called the Cuneraheuvel. The church's tower was built between 1492 and 1531.

In 1621, a palace was constructed at Rhenen for the ousted Frederick V. It was demolished in 1812.

World War II
Part of the center of Rhenen, which was located near the defensive Grebbelinie (Grebbe line), was destroyed during the German attack on the Netherlands in May 1940. Part of the reconstruction took place during the war. In 1945, the town was damaged again during the liberation of the country from German occupation.

Many or all of the Dutch soldiers who were killed by the Germans near Rhenen lie buried at the Erebegraafplaats (Cemetery of Honor), located along the Grebbeweg (N 225) near the top of the Grebbeberg. Across the road is an important war monument with a poem by J.C. Bloem.

In 2008 Rhenen celebrated its 750th anniversary.

Main sights

 Ouwehands Dierenpark, a zoo, founded in 1932.
 The Cunera Church, a late-Gothic hall-church, built between 1492 and 1531.
 Modern Roman Catholic church , built between 1958 and 1959.
 Building 'De Brakke' from 1787.
 Ruins of the 14th century Medieval defensive wall.
 The , a round gristmill from 1893.
 The  estate.
 Military War Cemetery Grebbeberg, a military cemetery on the Grebbeberg.

Transport
Rhenen railway station

Notable people 

 Frederick V (1596-1632), Count Palatine and Elector of the Palatinate from 1610 to 1623 and King of Bohemia (as Frederick I) from 1619 to 1620
 Giedo van der Garde (born 1985), a Dutch racing driver
 Touriya Haoud (born 1977), a Dutch actress, model and singer who lives in Los Angeles
 Madelein Meppelink (born 1989), a Dutch beach volleyball player, competed in the 2012 and 2016 Summer Olympics
 Jacob Nienhuys (1836–1927), founded the tobacco producer Deli Company in Sumatra
 Remy Reynierse (born 1961), is a former football player with 312 club caps, current coach at Sheffield Wednesday F.C.
 Bibiane Schoofs (born 1988), a Dutch professional tennis player
 Jacobus Tollius (1633–1696), a Dutch classicist
 Eelco Uri (born 1973), a Dutch male former water polo player, competed in the 1966 and 2000 Summer Olympics
 Lisa van Viegen (born 1978), stage name iET, a Dutch singer-songwriter and multi-instrumentalist

Gallery

References

External links 

 
Cities in the Netherlands
Municipalities of Utrecht (province)
Populated places in Utrecht (province)